The Altarpiece of Saints Ursula, Martin and Anthony is a reredo by the Spanish late Gothic painter Gonzalo Pérez, dating to 1420 and housed  in the Museu de Belles Arts of Valencia, Spain.

Painted in the International Gothic style (with influences, such as in St. Martin's  rich garments, by the Italian Gentile da Fabriano), it is one of the artist's few known works, painted for the Portaceli Monastery.

Altarpiece details

Sources

External links
 Page at the museum's website 

1420s paintings
Spanish paintings
Gothic paintings
Paintings in Valencia
Paintings depicting Jesus
Altarpieces
Paintings of Saint Ursula